Wolseley 18/85 may refer to:

 Wolseley 18/85 (1938 to 1948), an automobile produced in the United Kingdom from 1938 to 1948
 Wolseley 18/85 (1967 to 1971), an automobile produced in the United Kingdom from 1967 to 1971 as a variant of the BMC ADO17